Paul Verdier (died 6 September 2015) was a stage director, actor, and playwright, who also had a number of guest parts in American television.  He was married to Sonia Lloveras-Verdier.

Before moving to the United States, Verdier was a member of the Paris-based repertory companies of Jean-Louis Barrault/Madeleine Renaud and Nicolas Bataille.

Verdier and his wife opened the Stages Theatre Center in Hollywood in 1982, as a venue for bringing "the richness, flavor and variety of World Theatre to Los Angeles audiences".

In 1986, the couple opened a French restaurant—Cafe des Artistes—next door to the theatre.

Plays
 partial list
 Tales for people under 3 years of age (1982) – Translated, adapted and directed by Paul Verdier, from the play by Eugène Ionesco
 Slowmotion (1988) – Translated and directed by Paul Verdier, from the play by Eduardo Pavlovsky
 English Mint (1988) – Translated and directed by Paul Verdier, from L'Amante Anglaise by Marguerite Duras
 1789 (October 1989) – Translated, adapted and directed by Paul Verdier, from the 1970 play by Ariane Mnouchkine
 The night of Picasso (1990) – Translated and directed by Paul Verdier, from the play by Edoardo Erba
 Porco selvatico (1991) – Translated and directed by Paul Verdier, from the play by Edoardo Erba
 La Bête (1993 by playwright David Hirson) – Directed by Paul Verdier
 Miss Margarida's Way (by playwright Roberto Athayde) – Directed by Paul Verdier
 Changes (1995 by playwright Barbara Tarbuck) – Produced and directed by Paul Verdier
 Hyenas (2003) – Translated, adapted and directed by Paul Verdier, from a play by Christian Siméon

Filmography

References

External links

20th-century French dramatists and playwrights
French theatre directors
French male film actors
20th-century American dramatists and playwrights
American theatre directors
American people of French descent
2015 deaths
Year of birth missing